Lorna Doone is a 1951 American adventure film directed by Phil Karlson and starring Barbara Hale and Richard Greene. It is an adaptation of the 1869 novel Lorna Doone by R. D. Blackmore, set in the English West Country during the 17th century.

Plot
Lorna Doone falls for John Ridd, but is betrothed (against her will) to one Carver Doone. As the English Civil War looms, John is determined to defeat the vicious Doone family and win Lorna over.

Cast
 Barbara Hale as Lorna Doone
 Richard Greene as John Ridd
 Carl Benton Reid as Sir Ensor Doone
 William Bishop as Carver Doone
 Ron Randell as Tom Faggus
 Sean McClory as Charleworth Doone
 Onslow Stevens as Counsellor Doone
 Lester Matthews as King Charles II
 John Dehner as Baron de Wichehalse
 Gloria Petroff as Lorna Doone as a Child

Production

Development
Edward Small first announced plans to film the novel in 1944 and hired George Bruce to write a screenplay in 1946.

In 1946, Small sent representatives to Britain to scout locations. He said he wanted to make the film on location in Scotland. Charles Bennett and George Bruce worked on the early drafts of the script. In 1948, Small said he would make the film as co-production with J Arthur Rank starring Louis Hayward.

In 1948, Alfred Hitchcock announced plans to film the novel for Transatlantic Pictures. Small claimed he had registered the title in the US; Hitchcock could film the story but would not be able to call it Lorna Doone in the US. This prompted Small to announce he would start filming in England in association with Rank and producer John Beck on 1 March 1949. This was postponed due to the US–English film trade war of 1948–19 and in August 1949 filming was put back indefinitely.

The project was reactivated later in 1949 when Small signed a two-picture deal with Columbia Pictures, for Lorna Doone and The Brigand.

Shooting
It was decided to make the movie in Hollywood, with locations shot at Yosemite National Park. Richard Greene and Barbara Hale were cast in the leads and Jesse Lasky Jr did the final draft of the script. Filming began 17 May 1950. The final script was heavily influenced by Westerns.

"Whatever has been put on screen has been done with considerable loyalty to the novel," said Greene. "I don't think the British public will find too much fault with the treatment. What may be missed is the Cornish atmosphere."

Ron Randell, who played several leads for Sam Katzman, had a support role.

Reception
Reviews were mixed.

References

External links

 

1951 films
American historical films
1950s action films
1951 adventure films
1951 drama films
1950s historical films
1950s English-language films
Films scored by George Duning
Films based on Lorna Doone
Films directed by Phil Karlson
Columbia Pictures films
Films produced by Edward Small
Cultural depictions of Charles II of England
1950s American films
Films with screenplays by Richard Schayer